Gilbert of Bourbon-Montpensier (1443 – 15 October 1496, Pozzuoli), Count of Montpensier, was a member of the House of Bourbon. He was the son of Louis I, Count of Montpensier and Gabrielle La Tour, Count of Montpensier and Dauphin d'Auvergne. He was appointed to the Order of Saint Michael by King Charles VIII of France in October 1483.

Life
Gilbert was the first person, after a number of divisions of Auvergne in the Middle Ages, to carry the bloodlines of the respective dynasties of each of the three main divisions of Auvergne, the countship, the dukedom and the dauphinate.

His paternal grandmother Marie of Berry, Duchess of Bourbon, was heiress to the duchy of Auvergne. The creation for the Berry and Bourbon branches was made of lands that were confiscated from the count of Auvergne by Philip II of France. His paternal great-grandmother Anne of Auvergne was daughter of the Dauphin of Auvergne and after the extinction of her brother's line, in her issue the heiress thereof. Though Gilbert was by no means the primogenitural heir to any of them, as head of the cadet branch of his family, he received Montpensier and the dauphinate as appanages inside the extended family.

Marriage and issue

On 24 February 1482 Gilbert married Clara Gonzaga (1 July 1464 – 2 June 1503), daughter of Federico I of Gonzaga of Mantua; they had the following issue:
Louise, Duchess of Montpensier (1482 – 15 July 1561), eventually the heiress of all the Bourbon estates, but not titles
Louis II, Count of Montpensier (1483 – 14 August 1501)
Charles III, Duke of Bourbon (17 February 1490 – 6 May 1527, in battle), 
François, Duke of Châtellerault (1492 – 13 September 1515, Battle of Marignano)
Renée, Lady of Mercœur (1494 – 26 May 1539, Nancy), married on 26 June 1515 at the Château d'Amboise to Antoine, Duke of Lorraine
Anne (1495 – 1510, Spain)

Gilbert was made the Viceroy of Naples in 1495 after king Charles VIII of France occupied the city. In July 1496, Montpensier he was captured at Atella with the remaining French forces, he and his men were held in a malarial marshland near Pozzuoli, where he later died.

See also

Duke of Bourbon

References

Sources

House of Bourbon-Montpensier
Bourbon-Montpensier, Gilbert de
Bourbon-Montpensier, Gilbert de
Bourbon-Montpensier, Gilbert de
Bourbon-Montpensier, Gilbert de
15th-century peers of France
Military governors of Paris